Nevern is both a parish and a community in Pembrokeshire, Wales. The community includes the settlements of Felindre Farchog, Monington, Moylgrove and Bayvil.

History

Neolithic
The area around Nevern has been occupied since at least neolithic times (about 4,000 years ago); evidence includes barrows revealed in an aerial survey during the 2018 heatwave.

Norman rule
When the ruler of Deheubarth, Rhys ap Tewdwr, died in battle and his lands were forfeited to the Normans, Martin de Turribus became the Marcher Lord of Kemes, with his caput at Nevern, where he took over an existing fortification.

Norman castle
The early 12th century Nevern Castle stood on a spur of the hill northwest of the church. Under Martin's son, Robert fitz Martin, it was the only Norman castle to successfully resist the forces of Rhys ap Gruffydd's sons, who were trying to re-establish Deheubarth. Robert's son William later established peace with Rhys ap Gruffydd by marrying his daughter, Angharad. The castle changed hands several times over the following 80 years, and was eventually destroyed by Hywel Sais in 1195. In 1197, Robert and Angharad's son, William Fitz Martin founded Newport, and built a castle there, abandoning Nevern. In modern times little remains of the castle, but the site has been extensively excavated. It was probably a square building with a bastion at each corner, and may have been one of the earliest stone castles built in Wales.

Land ownership

In 1603, the antiquarian George Owen, Lord of Cemais, described Nevern as one of nine Pembrokeshire "boroughs in decay".

Nevern Bridge

Nevern Bridge spans the River Nevern in the centre of the village. The current bridge was built in the late 18th or early 19th century and is a Grade II listed structure. It has two unequal arches, recessed with keystones.

Parish

Cilgwyn extends to the south side of the Preseli Hills; a 1578 map in the British Library shows Kilgwin as a separate parish, and also Neverne, but the other quarters are not shown. Before becoming a quarter of Nevern parish, Cilgwyn was reduced from a parish to a chapelry, dedicated to St Mary. Nevern parish church (see below) is in Crugiau Quarter.

In 1833 the population of the parish, at 1,558 inhabitants, was nearly twice that of 2011.

Parish Church
The Norman Church of St Brynach is on the site of St Brynach's 6th century "clas", an important ecclesiastical centre. At the time when it is said that Dyfed had seven bishops, this was probably the seat of one. Except for the castellated tower, perilously undercut by the adjacent river Caman, most of the original Norman structure of the present building has been rebuilt. The church and churchyard are remarkable for the Celtic Cross, several inscribed stones and an avenue of yew trees. The church is a listed building, as are more than 60 other buildings in the community. The churchyard is designated at Grade II on the Cadw/ICOMOS Register of Parks and Gardens of Special Historic Interest in Wales.

In the churchyard is a "bleeding yew" that leaks red sap at certain times of the year. George Owen is buried here, and is commemorated by a plaque in the Henllys Chapel behind the organ.

Historical remains

The Nevern Cross on the south side of the church dates from the 10th century or early 11th century. It consists of two sections fitted together with a mortice and tenon joint, both cut from the local dolerite stone. It has classic braided decorations and inscriptions reading "dns" on one side and "h.an.eh" on the other. Nearby is the Vitalianus Stone, dating from around 500 AD, inscribed in Latin "VITALIANI EMERTO" and in Ogham "vitaliani". In the Trewern Chapel in the south transept, two inscribed stones are set into the window sills. The Maglocunus Stone is inscribed in Latin "MAGLOCUNI FILI CLUTORI" and in Ogham "maglicunas maqi clutar.." and is of the 5th century or early 6th century. The Braided Cross is of the early 10th century. There is a Pilgrim's Cross cut into the rock on the roadside between the village and the castle. Dyfed Archaeological Trust has carried out excavations at the castle site. The dolmen is under the care of Cadw, the Welsh Historic Monuments Agency.

References

Further reading
Dillwyn Miles, A Book on Nevern, Gomer, 1998,

External links 
Nevern Castle - official site; and further photographs
St. Brynach Church - Nevern Church
Article on Nevern Village, Church and Castle

Historical information and sources on GENUKI
Photographs of Nevern and surrounding area on Geograph

Villages in Pembrokeshire
Communities in Pembrokeshire
Registered historic parks and gardens in Pembrokeshire